Paul "The Dude" Morris (born 22 December 1967) is an Australian motor racing driver and team owner. The owner of Paul Morris Motorsport, he competes in Queensland sprint car racing and the Stadium Super Trucks, the latter of which includes the series' Australian Boost Mobile Super Trucks championship. He won the SST championship in 2017 and the Boost Mobile Super Trucks title in 2021.

Morris is one of two people, alongside Shane Van Gisbergen, to have won all three major car racing events at Mount Panorama; the Bathurst 1000, Bathurst 6 Hour and Bathurst 12 Hour.

Early career
Morris started his motor racing career at the age of 19 in 1987, driving in the Queensland Gemini Series. He won Rookie of the Year in his debut season, and won the state championship the following year. He spent the next three years competing in Formula Ford.

Morris made his Bathurst debut in 1991, driving a Toyota Corolla. He won the Class C title that year with Geoff Full.

He joined the BMW Works team in 1992, and competed in the Australian Touring Car Championship for several years. Morris went on to compete in the Australian Super Touring Championship from 1994 to 2000 (excluding 1998), winning four championships. His notable sponsors during this time were Benson & Hedges and Diet Coke. He also competed in the V8 Touring Car Championship full-time in 1994, driving a Holden Commodore sponsored by Diet Coke. That same year, he would claim another class victory at the Bathurst 1000 with German driver Altfrid Heger in a BMW, having written off his Holden in testing prior to the race.

In 1998, Morris drove for PacWest Racing in the PPG Dayton Indy Lights Championship in the United States. His best result was sixth in the opening round at Homestead.

V8 Supercars
Morris co-drove with the Holden Racing Team in the 1999 endurance events. He finished third with Mark Skaife at Bathurst in that year.

From 2000, Morris again competed in the V8 Supercar Series full-time. Originally sponsored by Big Kev, he was involved in a major start-line accident at the Oran Park round in 2000. He suffered a number of fractured vertebrae in this accident, and narrowly escaped the flaming wreckage of his VS Commodore.

Morris recovered without missing any V8 Supercar races, and he went on to achieve his first major success at Calder Park Raceway in 2001, where he won two of the three races and won the round overall.

In the week leading up to the final V8 Supercar round of 2008 Morris announced he would no longer be driving full-time in 2009 and that the team were searching for a full-time replacement in the No. 67 Commodore.

In 2011, Morris competes in the second-tier Fujitsu V8 Supercar Series in one of the teams older Commodores.

In 2014, Morris won the Bathurst 1000 outright for the first time as co-driver to Chaz Mostert for Ford Performance Racing. Morris had previously 'won' the 1997 AMP Bathurst 1000 in a Super Touring BMW 320i with Craig Baird. However the Morris/Baird BMW was disqualified immediately after the race as the team had mistakenly left Baird in the car at its last pit stop, resulting in Baird breaching race regulations by driving for more than three continuous hours. The disqualification handed the win to team mates Geoff and David Brabham.

Speaking over the 2015 V8 Supercars Winton SuperSprint Morris announced his retirement from Bathurst after losing his co-driver seat to Cameron Waters.

Morris continues to race in the V8 Development Series.

Sprintcars
Morris competes in Speedway Sprintcars in Australia in the KRE-engined No. 67 Supercheap Auto Sprintcar. Morris took his first Sprintcar pole position in Round 4 of the KRE Race Engines Track Championship at Brisbane International Speedway (Archerfield Speedway) in January 2011. He has also had heat wins in World Series Sprintcars.

Morris suffered a major crash at Archerfield during round 6 of the 2012/13 World Series Sprintcars. After winning his earlier heat race, Morris started from position 5 in the B Main, but lasted less than a ¼ of a lap after clipping the wheels of another car on the front straight resulting in his car going end over end and finally coming to rest in the middle of turn 2. Morris escaped the crash without injury, but his Sprintcar was in need of major repair.

Stadium Super Trucks
In 2015, Morris made his Speed Energy Formula Off-Road (Stadium Super Trucks) debut at Surfers Paradise, where he finished third in the first race. A doubleheader on 25 October saw Morris finish fifth and second to score the overall win. A year later, he ran much of the 2016 schedule and finished fourth in points, the highest championship run for a winless driver that year.

Morris contested the full 2017 schedule as he scored three wins at Adelaide and Darwin (twice). Entering the season finale at Lake Elsinore Diamond, Morris trailed Matthew Brabham by 15 points but did not participate due to a rib injury. In his place, he had off-road veteran Jerett Brooks drive his No. 67 truck, with all points scored by Brooks going to Morris; Brooks finished eighth and second in the weekend, enabling Morris to win the 2017 championship by one point over Brabham.

In May 2018, the series formed an alliance with Boost Mobile to increase its presence in Australia. As part of the agreement, Paul Morris Motorsport became a logistics partner for the series' Australian operations. However, SST was banned by the Confederation of Australian Motor Sport (CAMS) later that month for safety reasons. When the trucks returned in 2019 under the Boost Mobile Super Trucks name, Paul Morris Motorsport's Norwell Motorplex became its headquarters. In October 2019, Morris also ran his first SST race of the year at Gold Coast; he led much of the second race before colliding with Cole Potts on the final lap, surrendering the win to Brabham.

When the series began an Australian championship in 2020 called the Boost Mobile Super Trucks, Morris and Paul Morris Racing Academy development driver Luke van Herwaarde partnered to race under the Team Norwell name.

The 2021 Boost Mobile Super Trucks Series began with Morris winning two of three races in the opener at Symmons Plains Raceway before finishing second to Shae Davies in the last. The same pattern of winning the first two but being denied a sweep by Davies occurred a round later at Hidden Valley Raceway. The season ended early after the COVID-19 pandemic cancelled many of the final rounds. Morris and Davies were mathematically tied for the points lead with 93 points apiece, and the former held the tiebreaker as he had four wins to Davies' two.

Personal life
Morris is nicknamed "The Dude". He received the moniker when he returned from a trip to the United States in the 1990s, where the word "dude" was frequently used.

His son Nash Morris is also a racing driver who competes in the Super3 Series and Boost Mobile Super Trucks.

Career highlights
Winner, Australian Super Touring Championship 1995, 1997, 1999, 2000
Winner, Bathurst 1000 (Australian Touring Car Championship) 1991 (Class C), 1994 (Class B)
Winner, Bathurst 500 (Super Touring) 1999
3rd, Bob Jane T-Marts 1000 at Mount Panorama Circuit 1999
Winner, Calder Park V8 Supercar round 2001
3rd, Bathurst 24 Hour at Mount Panorama Circuit 2003
Winner Bathurst 12 Hour 2007 (BMW)
Winner 2014 Bathurst 1000 with Chaz Mostert
Winner 2017 Bathurst 6 Hour with Luke Searle
Winner, Stadium Super Trucks 2017

Career results

Complete Bathurst 1000 results

* Super Touring race

Indy Lights results

Complete Bathurst 24 Hour results

Bathurst 6 Hour

NASCAR Camping World West Series
(key) (Bold – Pole position awarded by qualifying time. Italics – Pole position earned by points standings or practice time. * – Most laps led.)

Stadium Super Trucks
(key) (Bold – Pole position. Italics – Fastest qualifier. * – Most laps led.)

Boost Mobile Super Trucks
(key) (Bold – Pole position. Italics – Fastest qualifier. * – Most laps led.)

 Season in progress.
 The race was abandoned after Matt Mingay suffered serious injuries in a crash on lap three.
 Standings were not recorded by the series for the 2020 season.

References

External links
 Official website
 
 Profile on Driver Database
 Profile on US Racing Reference
 Profile on German Speedsport
 Photos, articles & videos on Motorsport.com

1967 births
24 Hours of Daytona drivers
Australian sprint car drivers
Australian Touring Car Championship drivers
Formula Ford drivers
Formula Holden drivers
Indy Lights drivers
Living people
People from the City of Latrobe
Racing drivers from Victoria (Australia)
Stadium Super Trucks drivers
Supercars Championship drivers
V8SuperTourer drivers
Bathurst 1000 winners
People from Morwell, Victoria
Australian Endurance Championship drivers
BMW M drivers
PacWest Racing drivers